The 1984 Sam Houston State Bearkats football team represented Sam Houston State University as a member of the Gulf Star Conference (GSC) during the 1984 NCAA Division I-AA football season. Led by third-year head coach Ron Randleman, the Bearkats compiled an overall record of 8–3 with a mark of 3–2 in conference play, and finished third in the GSC.

Schedule

References

Sam Houston State
Sam Houston Bearkats football seasons
Sam Houston State Bearkats football